Walking the Dog is one of many musical numbers written in 1937 by George Gershwin for the Fred Astaire – Ginger Rogers film score for Shall We Dance. In the film, the music accompanies a sequence of walking a dog on board a luxury liner. In 1960, the sequence was published as "Promenade".

Most of the score from the film (composed and orchestrated by Gershwin) remains unpublished and unavailable in modern stereo recordings.

On September 22, 2013 it was announced that a musicological critical edition of the full orchestral score will be eventually released. The Gershwin family, working in conjunction with the Library of Congress and the University of Michigan, are working to make scores available to the public that represent Gershwin's true intent. The entire Gershwin project may take 30 to 40 years to complete, and it is unknown when the score to Shall We Dance (which includes Walking The Dog) will be released.

It is unknown whether the critical edition will include the round section heard on the soundtrack.

See also 
List of compositions by George Gershwin

References

External links 
Video – George Gershwin – Walking The Dog (03:17).

Songs with music by George Gershwin
University of Michigan
1937 songs